Neopetalia punctata is a dragonfly, the only member of the family Neopetaliidae.

It is endemic to Argentina and Chile.

References

Cordulegastroidea
Taxa named by Hermann August Hagen
Insects described in 1854